Yamato Colony can refer to some places in the United States:

Yamato Colony, California, a Japanese-American agricultural community in Livingston, California  
Yamato Colony, Florida, an early 20th-century Japanese agricultural community between Boca Raton and Delray Beach
Yamato Colony, Texas, an early 20th-century Japanese-owned sugar plantation near Brownsville, Texas